Parvati Kunda() is a natural fresh water lake located in Galtang village, Rasuwa District of Nepal. The lake lies at an altitude of 2550 m and it drains to Parvati river. It was originally called Chedingmo Kunda. In 2040 BS it was renamed to Parvati Kunda. 

The water from the lake is used for drinking purpose by locals. The lake is a natural himalayan wetland.

A festival is celebrated in the lake annually.

An ancient palace of Ghale king lies near the lake.

References

Lakes of Bagmati Province
Buildings and structures in Rasuwa District